Ugolini Peak is a sharp rock peak, over 2,200 m, surmounting the central part of a large ice-free massif 6 miles (10 km) south of Knobhead, at the south side of upper Ferrar Glacier in Victoria Land. Ugolini Ridge lies to its south east.

The features were named by Advisory Committee on Antarctic Names (US-ACAN) for Fiorenzo C. Ugolini, who studied Antarctic soil processes in the McMurdo Sound area in 1961–62 and 1962–63.

Mountains of Victoria Land
Scott Coast